Stokely-Van Camp Industrial Complex is located in Trenton, Mercer County, New Jersey, United States. The Van Camp's company built the cannery to make baked beans under the direction of Gilbert Van Camp and later became Stokely-Van Camp. The building was built in 1845 and was added to the National Register of Historic Places on March 11, 1983.

See also
National Register of Historic Places listings in Mercer County, New Jersey

References

Buildings and structures in Trenton, New Jersey
Industrial buildings and structures on the National Register of Historic Places in New Jersey
Industrial buildings completed in 1845
National Register of Historic Places in Trenton, New Jersey
New Jersey Register of Historic Places
Baked beans
Canneries